The Boeing Uninterruptible Autopilot is a system designed to take control of a commercial aircraft away from the pilot or flight crew in the event of a hijacking.

If implemented, the system would allow the craft to automatically guide itself to a landing at a designated airstrip. The "uninterruptible" autopilot would be activated either by pilots, by onboard sensors, or remotely via radio or satellite links by government agencies, if terrorists attempt to gain control of a flight deck.  

Both Boeing and Honeywell have contributed significantly to the introduction of digital autopilot technology into the civil aviation sector. A patent for the system was awarded to Boeing in 2006. Honeywell has also been developing a system with Airbus, and a prototype has been tested on small aircraft. 

Conspiracy theorists have claimed that the technology has been secretly fitted to some commercial airliners. Some, including historian Norman Davies, have blamed it for the disappearance of Malaysia Airlines Flight 370, the cause of which is unknown . According to Bob Mann, an airline industry consultant, evidence of the Boeing Uninterruptible Autopilot system being installed in a commercial airline has not been publicized and is not proven to exist. Safety concerns, including the possibility that such a system could be hacked, have prevented its roll-out.

References

Aircraft emergency systems
Aircraft hijacking
Boeing